is a former Japanese football player.

Playing career
Uchida was born in Komono, Mie on July 10, 1983. After graduating from high school, he joined J2 League club Yokohama FC in 2002. He got an opportunity to play from first season and became a regular player as offensive midfielder in summer 2003. Although the club results were sluggish every season, Yokohama won the champions in 2006 season and was promoted to J1 League first time in the club history. Although he played many matches, Yokohama finished at the bottom place in 2007 season and was relegated to J2 in a year. In 2008, he moved to Omiya Ardija. Although he could not become a regular player, he played many matches in 3 seasons. In 2011, he moved to Ventforet Kofu. However he could not play many matches. In 2012, he re-joined J2 club Yokohama FC for the first time in 4 years. Although he played many matches in 2013, his opportunity to play decreased from 2014. In 2017, he moved to Hong Kong and joined Southern District FC. He retired in September 2017.

Club statistics

References

External links

1983 births
Living people
Association football people from Mie Prefecture
Japanese footballers
J1 League players
J2 League players
Yokohama FC players
Omiya Ardija players
Ventforet Kofu players
Southern District FC players
People from Komono
Association football midfielders